Barthold may refer to:

Given name
 Bertulf (Archbishop of Trier) (died 883)

Surname
 Vasily Bartold, also known as Wilhelm Barthold  (1869–1930), a Turcologist and historian of Central Asia
 Charles Barthold, an American photographer
 John Barthold, American Major League Baseball pitcher
 Lauren Swayne Barthold (born 1965), American philosopher
 Peter Barthold, an Austrian footballer
 Gregory Bartold, an American who is also known as Maggie Bartold

See also
 Bartholdi (surname)
 Bartholdt